Mikhail Aleksandrovich Solovey (born 16 October 1980) is a Russian professional football coach and a former player. He works as a conditioning coach with FC Baltika Kaliningrad.

Club career
He played 7 seasons in the Russian Football National League for 6 different clubs.

References

External links
 

1980 births
People from Rybinsk
Living people
Russian footballers
FC Khimik-Arsenal players
FC Volgar Astrakhan players
FC Nizhny Novgorod (2007) players
FC SKA-Khabarovsk players
FC Mordovia Saransk players
FC Luch Vladivostok players
Association football defenders
FC Novokuznetsk players
FC Spartak Kostroma players
Sportspeople from Yaroslavl Oblast